Taishan is a township of Liangdang County in the Qin Mountains of southeastern Gansu province, China, located around  west of the border with Shaanxi and  southeast of the county seat. , it has eight villages under its administration.

See also 
 List of township-level divisions of Gansu

References 

Township-level divisions of Gansu
Liangdang County